Quaker Bridge Mall is a two-level super-regional mall located in the Clarksville section of Lawrence Township, New Jersey. As of 2022, the mall features the traditional tenants Macy's, and JCPenney. The mall currently features prominent specialty stores Coach New York, White House Black Market, and Ann Taylor.

The mall is on U.S. Route 1 near Interstate 295. The mall opened in 1975 and is managed by Simon Property Group (which owns 50% of it). It is also the location of the transmitter for the New Jersey-based radio station WKXW, better known as New Jersey 101.5.

History
Quaker Bridge Mall opened in 1975 with four anchors: Bamberger's, Hahne's, JCPenney and Sears. The mall's existence helped to spur growth along the Route 1 corridor with the opening of additional shopping and strip centers, as well as the reconstruction of numerous intersections on Route 1 to accommodate the rising levels in traffic.

An AMC 4-screen cinema opened February 1977 at the back entrance, under Woolworth's.  Department store changes took place in 1986 and 1990 when Bamberger's converted to Macy's and the closing of Hahne's allowed for the opening of Lord & Taylor. In 1988–89, the mall was heavily renovated. New flooring was added, new lighting was added, new seating areas added, the child's play area in the Sears wing was removed in favor of a planter and seating area, the majority of the fountains were removed, the mall was painted and the entrances facing Route 1 were redesigned. In the late 1990s, Woolworth's and the movie theater closed.

A proposed  expansion project in the 2000s would have added Neiman Marcus and Nordstrom, along with as many as 100 new stores and restaurants. Nordstrom's two-level,  store would have been the fifth Nordstrom store in New Jersey. The township approved the new JCPenney building and parking deck in 2008.

On October 25, 2010, the Quaker Bridge Mall received approval from Lawrence Township to build an expansion. In 2012, Simon began a large-scale renovation of the mall, replacing flooring, the escalator in the center court, and adding a glass elevator in front of Lord & Taylor and escalators in front of JCPenney. A new food court was built on the upper level.

On May 31, 2018, Sears announced that its store would be closing as part of a plan to close 72 stores nationwide..

On August 27, 2020, it was announced that Lord & Taylor would be closing as part of the chain's nationwide liquidation.

Gallery

References

External links

Quaker Bridge Mall website
International Council of Shopping Centers: Quaker Bridge Mall
Quakerbridge Mall expansion leasing sheet

Buildings and structures in Mercer County, New Jersey
Lawrence Township, Mercer County, New Jersey
Shopping malls in New Jersey
Shopping malls established in 1975
Simon Property Group
Tourist attractions in Mercer County, New Jersey
Shopping malls in the New York metropolitan area
U.S. Route 1
1975 establishments in New Jersey